Nicholas B. Bucci (born July 16, 1990) is a Canadian former professional baseball pitcher. Bucci competed for the Canadian national baseball team in international competition.

Career
Bucci attended St. Patrick's High School in Sarnia, Ontario. Bucci committed to enroll at Bradley University on a college baseball scholarship to play for the Bradley Braves baseball team, but when the Milwaukee Brewers drafted Bucci in the 18th round (548th overall) of the 2008 Major League Baseball Draft, he opted to sign with the Brewers, foregoing his collegiate career.

Bucci made his professional debut that season with the Arizona League Brewers of the Rookie-level Arizona League. In 2009, he pitched for the Helena Brewers of the Rookie-level Pioneer League, where he was named a Pioneer League All-Star pitcher. He received a brief promotion to the Huntsville Stars of the Class-AA Southern League. In 2010, the Brewers assigned Bucci to the Wisconsin Timber Rattlers of the Class-A Midwest League, where he had a  scoreless innings pitched streak and was a midseason All-Star. In 2011, he was promoted to the Brevard County Manatees in the Class-A Advanced Florida State League.

Bucci has played for the Canadian national baseball team. He participated in the 2009 Baseball World Cup. In 2011, he participated in the 2011 Baseball World Cup, winning the bronze medal, and the Pan American Games, winning the gold medal. Along with his teammates, Bucci was inducted into the Canadian Baseball Hall of Fame in 2012.

Bucci was added to the Brewers 40-man roster after the 2012 season. He outrighted off the roster on October 4, 2013.

References

External links

1990 births
Living people
Arizona League Brewers players
Baseball people from Ontario
Baseball pitchers
Baseball players at the 2011 Pan American Games
Brevard County Manatees players
Canadian expatriate baseball players in the United States
Helena Brewers players
Huntsville Stars players
Pan American Games gold medalists for Canada
Pan American Games medalists in baseball
Phoenix Desert Dogs players
Sportspeople from Sarnia
Wisconsin Timber Rattlers players
Medalists at the 2011 Pan American Games